Jake Thomas Buchanan (born September 24, 1989) is an American professional baseball pitcher who is a free agent. He has played in Major League Baseball (MLB) for the Houston Astros, Chicago Cubs, and Cincinnati Reds.

Career

Amateur
Buchanan attended North Gaston High School in Dallas, North Carolina. He then enrolled at North Carolina State University (NC State), where he played college baseball for the NC State Wolfpack. By his junior year at NC State, Buchanan emerged as the team's best pitcher. In 2009, he played collegiate summer baseball with the Cotuit Kettleers of the Cape Cod Baseball League.

Houston Astros
The Houston Astros selected Buchanan in the eighth round of the 2010 Major League Baseball Draft. In 2011, Buchanan pitched for the Lancaster JetHawks of the Class A-Advanced California League and the Corpus Christi Hooks of the Class AA Texas League. Pitching to a 3.80 earned run average, the Astros named Buchanan their Minor League Pitcher of the Year.

In 2012, 5.25 ERA with Corpus Christi and the Oklahoma City RedHawks of the Class AAA Pacific Coast League. Assigned to Corpus Christi to start the 2013 season, Buchanan led the Texas League in ERA and walks plus hits per innings pitched during the first half of the season, and the Astros promoted him to Oklahoma City after he participated in the Texas League All-Star Game. Buchanan was assigned to Oklahoma City to start the 2014 season.

He made his MLB debut on June 21, 2014. Buchanan was designated for assignment by Astros on September 1, 2015, to make room for Joe Thatcher on the 40 man roster.

Chicago Cubs
On March 31, 2016, Buchanan signed a minor league deal with the Chicago Cubs. He was promoted to the major-league roster from the Triple-A Iowa Cubs when rosters expanded on September 1. Buchanan appeared in two games for the Cubs to finish 2016, and had a 1–0 record with a 1.50 ERA. The Cubs eventually won the 2016 World Series, giving Buchanan his first championship title, although he did not play in the postseason.

Cincinnati Reds
Buchanan was claimed off waivers by the Cincinnati Reds on May 25, 2017. On June 27, 2017, Buchanan was designated for assignment by the Reds. On June 29, Buchanan was outrighted to the minor leagues but rejected the assignment and became a free agent.

Arizona Diamondbacks
On July 6, 2017, Buchanan signed a minor league contract with the Arizona Diamondbacks. He became a free agent at the end of the season, and signed another minor league contract with the Diamondbacks on December 26. He elected free agency on November 3, 2018.

Oakland Athletics
On November 13, 2018, Buchanan signed a minor league deal with the Oakland Athletics. He was released on July 30, 2019.

Washington Nationals
On August 23, 2019, Buchanan signed a minor league deal with the Washington Nationals. He elected free agency after the season on November 4.

High Point Rockers
On February 28, 2020, Buchanan signed with the High Point Rockers of the Atlantic League of Professional Baseball. He did not play a game for the team because of the cancellation of the ALPB season due to the COVID-19 pandemic and became a free agent after the year.

Los Angeles Angels
On March 4, 2021, Buchanan signed with the Gastonia Honey Hunters of the Atlantic League of Professional Baseball. However, on May 14, before the ALPB season began, Buchanan signed a minor league contract with the Los Angeles Angels. He elected free agency on November 7, 2021.

Personal life
Buchanan married former NC State swimmer Chelsa Messinger on January 25, 2014. The two met in college when they were both student athletes at NC State.

References

External links

1989 births
Living people
Baseball players from Charlotte, North Carolina
Major League Baseball pitchers
Houston Astros players
Chicago Cubs players
Cincinnati Reds players
NC State Wolfpack baseball players
Cotuit Kettleers players
Tri-City ValleyCats players
Lancaster JetHawks players
Corpus Christi Hooks players
Oklahoma City RedHawks players
Fresno Grizzlies players
Toros del Este players
American expatriate baseball players in the Dominican Republic
Iowa Cubs players
Louisville Bats players
Reno Aces players
Las Vegas Aviators players
Arizona Complex League Angels players
Salt Lake Bees players